Joseph Michael Bauress (born 1 January 2006) is an English professional footballer who plays as a midfielder for Burnley.

Club career
Born in Liverpool, Bauress is a product of the Burnley youth academy. On 8 July 2022, he was promoted to the Burnley U18s for the 2022–23 season, signing a scholarship contract.

He made his professional debut as a late substitute with Burnley in a 3–1 EFL Cup win over Crawley Town on 8 November 2022.

International career
Bauress was first called up to a training camp for the England U15s in February 2020. He made an appearance with the England U15s against Belgium in November 2020.

Personal life
Bauress is the son of the retired footballer Gary Bauress.

References

External links
 

2006 births
Living people
Footballers from Liverpool
English footballers
England youth international footballers
Association football midfielders
Burnley F.C. players